Below is a complete list of state visits made by Olav V of Norway during his reign from 1957 to 1991. A state visit is a formal visit by one head of state to another country, at the invitation of the other country's head of state. State visits are the highest form of diplomatic contact between two states, and are marked by major ceremonial and diplomatic formality. As such this list might give an indication to the foreign relations of Norway during this period.

List

See also
List of state visits made by Haakon VII of Norway
List of state visits made by Harald V of Norway

Sources
 Royal House list of state visits

Olav 05
Olav V